Xenobolus is a genus of millipedes in the family Pachybolidae, containing two species found in India and Sri Lanka. The species are unusual within the Pachybolidae in being boldly colored with red bands or spots on a blackish background color.

References

Spirobolida
Millipedes of Asia
Millipede genera